Joe Wood (25 April 1904 – 16 July 1972) was an Australian rules footballer who played with North Melbourne in the Victorian Football League (VFL). His name has also been given as Joe or Jack Woods.

Woods was North Melbourne's leading goal-kicker in the 1925 VFL season, their first year in the league. He kicked 27 goals, six of them in a win over South Melbourne.

References

External links

1904 births
1972 deaths
Australian rules footballers from Victoria (Australia)
North Melbourne Football Club players